Wikie (born June 1, 2001) is a female killer whale (orca) who lives at the Marineland of Antibes in Antibes, France.

In 2009, Wikie was artificially inseminated with semen from Ulises, a male orca who currently lives at SeaWorld San Diego in California. The artificial insemination resulted in the birth of her first calf (Moana) on March 16, 2011. Her calf was the first killer whale to be born through artificial insemination in Europe. Wikie gave birth to her second calf (Keijo) on November 20, 2013.

Communication with humans

It was reported in January 2018, through the Proceedings of the Royal Society, that researchers from Universidad Católica de Chile, Universidad Compluense de Madrid and St. Andrews, working at the Marineland of Antibes, had successfully taught Wikie to mimic human words such as 'hello', 'bye bye' and 'Amy' (her instructor), as well as count to three, through using her blowhole. Wikie is thought to be the world's first killer whale to ever mimic human speech.

Following the announcement of Wikie's ability to mimic human language, the People for the Ethical Treatment of Animals (PETA) and Humane Society International called for Wikie to be released from captivity.

See also
 List of captive orcas
 List of individual cetaceans

References

Individual orcas
2001 animal births
Talking animals